Ofarim may refer to:

 Beit Aryeh-Ofarim, an Israeli settlement and local council in the northern West Bank

People with the surname
Abi Ofarim, born Avraham Reichstadt (1937–2018), Israeli musician and dancer
Esther Ofarim (born 1941), Israeli singer
Esther & Abi Ofarim, musical duo
Gil Ofarim (born 1982), German singer, songwriter and occasional actor, son of Abi Ofarim